Kai Brodersen (born 6 June 1958) is a contemporary ancient historian and classicist on the faculty of the University of Erfurt. He has edited, and translated, both ancient works and modern classical studies. His research focuses on "Applied Sciences" in antiquity, geography, historiography, rhetoric and ancient jokes, mythography and paradoxography, Septuagint studies and Aristeas, inscriptions and curse tablets, early Greek and Hellenistic history, Roman provinces (including Britannia), women and men in the Ancient World, turning points of Ancient History, history of classical scholarship and reception, often with twist (including Asterix) - plus a book for children.

Biography
Kai Brodersen read Ancient History, Classics and (Protestant) Theology, funded by the "Stiftung Maximilianeum" and the Studienstiftung, at the University of Erlangen-Nuremberg, Ludwig Maximilian University of Munich (Germany), and the University of Oxford. From LMU Munich he holds a Dr. phil. (1986) and a Dr. phil. habil. (1995). He is married and has 4 grown-up children.

In 1996/7 he was made Chair of Ancient History at the University of Mannheim, which he then served for more than 10 years in leading positions (Dean, Dean of Studies and Dean of Finance, 6 years as Vice-President). In 2008, he was appointed Professor of Ancient Culture (Classics) at the University of Erfurt which he served as its president from 2008 to 2014, and continues to serve as a professor.

He has been a visiting fellow at Newcastle University (2000/01), University of St Andrews (2001/02), Royal Holloway, University of London (2006/7), St John's College, Oxford (2007/8), Lucian Blaga University of Sibiu (2014-2020), the University of Western Australia (2015) and the Wissenschaftkolleg Greifswald (2019-). He is a full member of the Saxonian Academy of Sciences and Humanities, and managing editor of the international journal of ancient History Historia.

References

External links
https://www.uni-erfurt.de/philosophische-fakultaet/seminare-professuren/historisches-seminar/antike-kultur/kai-brodersen

20th-century German historians
Academic staff of the University of Erfurt
Studienstiftung alumni
Alumni of St John's College, Oxford
German classical scholars
Living people
1958 births
German male non-fiction writers
21st-century German historians